Li Ting (born January 31, 1985, in Yingkou, Liaoning) is a Chinese sprint canoer who competed in the mid-2000s. At the 2004 Summer Olympics in Athens, she finished ninth in the K-1 500 m event.

References

Sports-Reference.com profile

1985 births
Living people
People from Yingkou
Canoeists from Liaoning
Olympic canoeists of China
Canoeists at the 2004 Summer Olympics
Chinese female canoeists